Fred Thomas is an American bassist best known for his work with singer James Brown for over thirty years. He performed on many R&B hits of the 1970s. His last recording is on the 2018 album We Came to Play.

Career
Thomas grew up in the US state of Georgia. He moved to New York City in 1965 and co-founded his own band with guitarist Hearlon "Cheese" Martin. He was the bassist as well as the lead vocalist of the group. He said: "I did my own thing, which is to keep a nice bottom in the pocket. I never bothered with any fancy stuff because I always did the singing in my bands, and you can't be fancy and sing".

In 1971 James Brown saw the band at Smalls Paradise club in Harlem. Brown was in search of new musicians for his own band. He did an impromptu performance with the band and decided to hire the whole group. Thomas said his band used to cover Brown's songs and that joining Brown was a smooth transition for them. He recorded on Brown's releases during 1970s. The first album titled Hot Pants was in 1971. He also recorded on releases by The J.B.'s. Many of these recordings were later sampled in hip hop music, such as "Pass the Peas", "Gimme Some More", and "Escape-ism".

Thomas performed with Brown for more than thirty years, longer than other bassists in that position. He recorded on several R&B number one hits such as "Hot Pants", "Make It Funky", and "Papa Don't Take No Mess". In a 2005 interview he expressed satisfaction with his work, stating: "I've been involved in one of the biggest, most legendary acts in the world. It's gone on for a long time – 33 years, on and off – and I feel good about the musicians I've played with".

After Brown's death in 2006, Thomas transitioned back to fronting his own group and collaborating with various bands. His later recordings are with Naomi Shelton & the Gospel Queens in 2014 and The J.B.'s in 2018.

Discography
Credits adapted in part from AllMusic.

With James Brown
Revolution of the Mind (1971)
Hot Pants (1971)
Get on the Good Foot (1972)
The Payback (1973)
Hell (1974)

With The J.B.'s
Food for Thought (1972)
Doing It to Death (1973)
Funky Good Time: The Anthology (1995)
Pass the Peas: The Best of the J.B.'s (2000)
Bring the Funk on Down (2002)
The Lost Album (2011)
We Came to Play (2018)

With Culture
Good Things (1989)

With Naomi Shelton & the Gospel Queens
Cold World (2014)

Notes

References

External links
Fred Thomas at MusicRadar by Rob Power, 2017
The J.B.'s members 2019 at archive.org

Living people
American funk bass guitarists
American male bass guitarists
American rhythm and blues bass guitarists
James Brown Orchestra members
American male guitarists
Guitarists from Georgia (U.S. state)
Musicians from New York City
20th-century American guitarists
20th-century bass guitarists
Year of birth unknown
Year of birth missing (living people)